S. M. Jaglul Hayder (এস, এম, জগলুল হায়দার) is a Bangladesh Awami League politician and the incumbent Member of Parliament from Satkhira-4.

Early life
Hayder was born on 29 July 1963. He has a B.A. degree.

Career
Hayder was elected to Parliament on 5 January 2014 from Satkhira-4 as a Bangladesh Awami League candidate.

References

Awami League politicians
Living people
1963 births
10th Jatiya Sangsad members
11th Jatiya Sangsad members